Malvand may refer to:
 Malvand, Razavi Khorasan
 Malvand, South Khorasan